Spatoglossum chapmanii is a marine brown algal species in the family Dictyotaceae,  endemic to New Zealand.

References

External links
spatoglossum chapmanii occurrence data from GBIF
 Museum of New Zealand Te Papa Tongarewa: Spatoglossum chapmanii Lindauer (Species)

Flora of New Zealand
Dictyotaceae